Campeonato Brasileiro 2007 may refer to:

Campeonato Brasileiro Série A 2007
Campeonato Brasileiro Série B 2007
Campeonato Brasileiro Série C 2007

See also 
 Campeonato Brasileiro (disambiguation)